Yucca angustissima, the narrowleaf yucca, is a plant in the family Agavaceae, known as the "narrow-leaved yucca." It is native to Arizona, New Mexico, Colorado and Utah, but grown elsewhere as an ornamental.

Yucca angustissima is a low-lying species forming colonies of basal rosettes up to 3 m (10 feet) in diameter. Leaves are long and thin, up to 150 cm long but rarely more than 2 cm across. Flowers are white to cream or greenish-white, pendant, borne in racemes on stalks up to 2 m (7 feet) tall. Fruit is a dry capsule with black seeds.

Yucca angustissima is relatively abundant, and although it has local threats, its population appears to be stable overall.

Varieties
Numerous varietal names have been proposed, but 4 are currently recognized:

 Yucca angustissima var. angustissima—Arizona, Utah, New Mexico, Colorado
 Yucca angustissima var. avia Reveal—Utah only
 Yucca angustissima var. kanabensis (McKelvey) Reveal—Arizona and Utah
 Yucca angustissima var. toftiae (S.L.Welsh) Reveal—Utah only

References

External links
US Department of Agriculture plants profile Yucca angustissima
photo of herbarium specimen at Missouri Botanical Garden, type of Yucca angustissima, collected near Picacho Peak, Arizona
Southwestern Colorado Wildflowers
Dave's Garden, PlantFiles: Narrow-leaved Yucca, Yucca angustissima
Benny's Cactus, Yucca angustissima ssp.  kanabensis
Gartendatenbank, Gabriele Jesdinsky, Berlin, Palmlilien (Yucca angustissima)
Sunshine Seeds, Ahlen Germany, Yucca angustissima, Palmlilie, Yucca

angustissima
Flora of Arizona
Flora of New Mexico
Flora of Colorado
Flora of Utah
Plants described in 1902
Taxa named by George Engelmann
Garden plants of North America
Drought-tolerant plants